INS Kolkata is the lead ship of the  stealth guided-missile destroyers of the Indian Navy.  She was constructed at Mazagon Dock Limited (MDL), and was handed over to the navy on 10 July 2014 after completing her sea trials. The ship was officially commissioned by Prime Minister Narendra Modi in a ceremony held on 16 August 2014.

Construction
The keel of Kolkata was laid down in September 2003 and she was launched on 30 March 2006. Her commissioning was originally planned for 2010, but this was delayed to 16 August 2014 as a result of a series of project delays. During her construction at MDL, she was given the designation Yard-701.

Sea trials

The commissioning of Kolkata was delayed from 2010 to 2014 due to delays in her construction and technical problems which were found during her sea trials. The issue detected was generation of additional noise, which occurred when the engine, gear box and the shaft were operated together, but which worked issue-free when run independently. The issues were fixed and the sea trials were completed by February 2014, when the ship returned to MDL to undergo minor work before delivery.

2014 carbon dioxide leak

On 7 March 2014, during a complete check-up of the ship's machinery to fix the problems found during sea trials, a naval officer was killed and several workers were injured when a valve on a CO2 bottle malfunctioned during a test of the vessel's carbon dioxide fire-fighting unit at the Mazagaon dockyard. For the test, fire-retarding carbon dioxide gas was to be released into a compartment; the test was part of the destroyer's delivery trials. Kolkatas engineering officer-designate, Commander Kuntal Wadhwa, inhaled a large amount of gas and was rushed to St George's Hospital, where he was pronounced dead. Two dockyard officials who also inhaled the gas were also taken to hospital for treatment. MDL stated that the incident will not delay the scheduled commissioning of the ship.

Weapon trials

As part of her pre-commissioning weapon trials at sea, Kolkata test-fired a BrahMos missile off Karwar's coast on 9 June 2014, and the test met all parameters. On 15 February 2015, BrahMos missile was on test fired from INS Kolkata during the Tropex exercise in the Arabian Sea.

On 29 December 2015 and 30 December 2015 the Indian Navy successfully test-fired the Barak 8 missile from INS Kolkata. Two missiles were fired at high speed targets, during naval exercises being undertaken in the Arabian Sea.

Service history

See also
 - sister-ship and second of the class.
 - sister-ship and third of the class.

References

Kolkata-class destroyers
Destroyers of the Indian Navy
Ships built in India
2006 ships